Kremenchugsky Uyezd (Кременчугский уезд) was one of the subdivisions of the Poltava Governorate of the Russian Empire. It was situated in the southern part of the governorate. Its administrative centre was Kremenchug (Kremenchuk).

Demographics
At the time of the Russian Empire Census of 1897, Kremenchugsky Uyezd had a population of 244,894. Of these, 80.3% spoke Ukrainian, 13.1% Yiddish, 5.5% Russian, 0.5% Polish, 0.2% German, 0.1% Belarusian and 0.1% Tatar as their native language.

References

 
Uezds of Poltava Governorate
Poltava Governorate